Charles Franklin Born (April 24, 1903 – May 24, 1979) was a major general in the United States Air Force and an All-American football player.

Biography
Born was born in Racine, Wisconsin, to Frank and Martha (née: Madera) Born. His father was born in Germany, and was a city of Racine fireman. He had two younger brothers, Captain Howard and Admiral Arthur Born, who were naval officers, and a younger sister, Grace. He graduated from St. John's Military Academy in 1924, where he was chosen as honor graduate, and West Point in 1928. On May 4, 1949, in Arlington, Virginia, he married the former Miss Eleanor Mae Moller. He died on May 24, 1979, in Phoenix, Arizona and was laid to rest at West Point Cemetery. With his first wife, Florence née: Fountain, he had 3 children; Charles Jr., JoAnne, and Charlotte. His brothers are buried in Arlington National Cemetery.

United States Military Academy
Born graduated from the United States Military Academy in 1928. While there, he was an All-American member of the Army Black Knights football and lacrosse team. He was also a member of the ice hockey team. He was selected as a first-team end by the All-America Board for the 1925 College Football All-America Team.  He was also named a second-team All-American by the Associated Press.

He died on May 24, 1979, in Phoenix, Arizona, and was buried in West Point Cemetery.

Military career
Upon graduation he was assigned to the Cavalry. In 1934, he transferred to the Air Corps. He was given command of the 50th Observation Squadron in 1936. In 1937, he was named an instructor at the United States Military Academy. During World War II, he took command of the Antilles Air Command and assistant chief of staff for operations and training of the Northwest African Strategic Air Force before being named assistant chief of staff for operations and training and eventually deputy commander of the Fifteenth Air Force. Following the war, he was given command of the Second Air Force and the Fifteenth Air Force. In 1947, he was appointed chief of staff of Tactical Air Command. Later, he would become deputy chief of staff for operations of the United States Air Forces in Europe. In 1951, he was named deputy for operations of Air Training Command. His retirement was effective as of January 1, 1955.

Assignments
 1928-XX-XX – 1933-XX-XX – Lieutenant, US Army, 4th Cavalry Regiment, Fort Meade, South Dakota
 1933-02-XX – 1933-XX-XX – Pilot trainee, Air Corps Primary Flying School, Randolph Field, Texas
 1933-XX-XX – 1934-02-XX – Student, Air Corps Advanced Flying School, Kelly Field, Texas
 1934-02-XX – 1934-04-XX – 72nd Bombardment Squadron, Luke Field, Hawaii
 1934-08-XX – 1936-XX-XX – Assistant Supply Officer, Assistant Engineering Officer, Luke Field, Hawaii
 1936-XX-XX – 1937-06-XX – Commanding Officer, 50th Observation Squadron, Luke Field, Hawaii
 1937-06-XX – 1939-05-XX – Instructor, general military law, U.S. Military Academy, West Point, New York
 1939-05-XX – 1939-08-XX – Student, Air Corps Tactical School, Maxwell Field, Alabama
 1939-08-XX – 1940-06-XX – Instructor, general military law, U.S. Military Academy, West Point, New York
 1940-06-XX – 1941-08-XX – Commanding Officer, 5th Bombardment Squadron, Mitchel Field, New York
 1941-08-XX – 1941-12-XX – Commanding Officer, 9th Bombardment Group, Rio Hato, Panama
 1941-12-XX – 1942-05-XX – Operations Officer, VI Interceptor Command, Borinquen Field, Puerto Rico
 1942-08-21 – 1942-10-07 – Commanding Officer 36th Fighter Command, Borinquen Field, Puerto Rico
 1942-10-08 – 1942-10-16 – Commanding Officer 25th Bombardment Group,  Borinquen Field, Puerto Rico
 1942-10-17 – 1943-05-11 – Commander Trinidad Detachment, 6th Fighter Command, Antilles Air Task Force, Borinquen Field, Puerto Rico
 1943-05-20 – 1943-06-30 – Commanding General Trinidad Detachment, Antilles Air Task Force, Borinquen Field, Puerto Rico
 1943-05-20 – 1943-06-30 – Commanding General 6th Fighter Command, Antilles Air Task Force, Borinquen Field, Puerto Rico
 1943-07-29 – 1943-09-30 – Assistant Chief of Staff for Operations & Training (A-3), II Bomber Command, Hq 2nd Air Force, Spokane, Washington
 1943-10-01 – 1944-10-07 – Assistant Chief of Staff for Operations & Training (A-3), 15th Air Force, Tunis, Tunisia, Italy
 1944-10-08 – 1945-03-07 – Deputy Commanding General, 15th Air Force, Tunis, Tunisia, Italy
 1945-04-XX – 1945-11-25 – Assistant Chief of Staff for Operations & Training, Continental Air Forces, Bolling Field, Washington D.C.
 1945-09-07 – 1945-12-31 – Director of Separation, Continental Air Forces, Bolling Field, Washington D.C.
 1945-11-26 – 1946-03-16 – Chief of Staff, Continental Air Forces, Bolling Field, Washington D.C.
 1946-03-19 – 1946-03-31 – Commanding General, 2nd Air Force, Colorado Springs AAB, Colorado
 1946-03-31 – 1947-04-15 – Commanding General 15th Air Force, Colorado Springs AAB, Colorado
 1947-04-21 – 1947-09-03 – Chief of Staff, Tactical Air Command, Langley AFB, Virginia
 1947-09-04 – 1948-10-03 – Deputy Commanding General Indoctrination Division, Air Training Command, Lackland AFB, Texas
 1947-09-04 – 1948-10-03 – Chief of Staff, Indoctrination Division, Air Training Command, Lackland AFB, Texas
 1948-10-16 – 1949-04-07 – Commanding General of the Indoctrination Division, Air Training Command, Lackland AFB, Texas
 1949-05-01 – 1951-01-11 – Deputy Chief of Staff for Operations, US Air Forces in Europe, Wiesbaden, Germany
 1951-01-26 – 1952-11-XX – Deputy Chief of Staff for Operations, Air Training Command, Scott AFB, Illinois
 1952-11-01 – 1953-08-XX – Commanding General 3600th Flying Training Wing, Luke AFB, Arizona
 1953-08-XX – 1953-10-XX – Vice Commanding General Crew Training Air Force, Air Training Command, Randolph AFB, Texas
 1953-10-XX – 1955-01-01 – Commanding General Crew Training Air Force, Air Training Command, Randolph AFB, Texas
 1955-01-01 – Retired

Awards he received include the Distinguished Service Medal, the Legion of Merit with two oak leaf clusters, the Distinguished Flying Cross, and the Air Medal with oak leaf cluster. Born was also an honorary Knight Commander of the Order of the Bath of the United Kingdom.

Decorations

References

1903 births
1979 deaths
American football ends
Army Black Knights football players
Army Black Knights men's lacrosse players
Army Black Knights men's ice hockey players
United States Army Air Forces pilots of World War II
United States Military Academy alumni
United States Military Academy faculty
United States Air Force generals
All-American college football players
Recipients of the Air Medal
Honorary Knights Commander of the Order of the Bath
Recipients of the Distinguished Flying Cross (United States)
Recipients of the Air Force Distinguished Service Medal
Recipients of the Legion of Merit
Military personnel from Wisconsin
Players of American football from Wisconsin
Sportspeople from Racine, Wisconsin